Timothy J. Corbett (June 10, 1858 – July 20, 1939)  was an American prelate of the Roman Catholic Church. He served as Bishop of Crookston from 1910 to 1938.

Biography

Early life 
Timothy Corbett was born on June 10, 1858, in Mendota, Minnesota, and raised in Minneapolis. He was privately educated by Father James McGolrick, who sent him to study at the lower seminary of Meximieux in France in 1876. In 1880, Corbett enrolled at the Grand Seminary of Montreal in Montreal, Quebec.  He completed his studies at St. John's Seminary in Boston, Massachusetts.

Priesthood 
Corbett was ordained to the priesthood in Boston by Archbishop John Williams for the Archdiocese of St. Paul on June 12, 1886. With the establishment of the Diocese of Duluth in 1889, Corbett became rector of the Sacred Heart Cathedral in Duluth, Minnesota. He also served as chancellor of the new diocese .

Bishop of Crookston 
On April 9, 1910, Corbett was appointed the first Bishop of the newly erected Diocese of Crookston by Pope Pius X. He received his episcopal consecration on May 19, 1910 from Archbishop John Ireland, with Bishops James McGolrick and James Trobec serving as co-consecrators. During his 28-year tenure, Corbett established over 50 churches and 12 schools through soliciting funds.

Retirement and legacy 
On June 25, 1938, Corbett's resignation as bishop of Crookston was accepted by Pope Pius XI, who appointed him titular bishop of Vita. Timothy Corbett died on July 20, 1939, in Crookston at age 81.

References

 

1858 births
1939 deaths
People from Mendota, Minnesota
Saint John's Seminary (Massachusetts) alumni
Roman Catholic bishops of Crookston
20th-century Roman Catholic bishops in the United States